Perry Run is a stream in Morgan County, in the U.S. state of Ohio.

The stream bears the name of William Perry, a pioneer blacksmith.

See also
List of rivers of Ohio

References

Rivers of Morgan County, Ohio
Rivers of Ohio